Does It End Right? is a 1914 American silent short drama film directed by Sydney Ayres. It stars William Garwood, Charlotte Burton, Louise Lester, Vivian Rich, Jack Richardson and Harry von Meter.

External links

1914 films
1914 drama films
Silent American drama films
American silent short films
American black-and-white films
Films directed by Sydney Ayres
1914 short films
1910s American films